Juliana Hatfield (born July 27, 1967) is an American musician and singer-songwriter from the Boston area, formerly of the indie rock bands Blake Babies, Some Girls, and The Lemonheads.  She also fronted her own band, The Juliana Hatfield Three, along with bassist Dean Fisher and drummer Todd Philips, which was active in the mid-1990s and again in the mid-2010s.  It was with the Juliana Hatfield Three that she produced her best-charting work, including the critically acclaimed albums Become What You Are (1993) and Whatever, My Love (2015) and the singles "My Sister" (1993) and "Spin the Bottle" (1994).

She has performed and recorded as a solo artist and as one half of Minor Alps with Matthew Caws of Nada Surf. In December 2014, Paste named her cover of the song "Needle in the Hay" by Elliott Smith number 10 in a list of the 20 Best Cover Songs of 2014. In 2014, she reformed The Juliana Hatfield Three, announcing the new album Whatever, My Love for 2015. In late December, Stereogum named the album "one of their most anticipated albums of 2015", and on January 4, 2015, Consequence of Sound named it "one of the 50 most anticipated albums of 2015."

In 2016 she formed a collaboration with Paul Westerberg under the moniker The I Don't Cares to release the album Wild Stab.  More recently, she has released an album of original work titled Weird in 2019, sandwiched between two albums of cover songs, Juliana Hatfield Sings Olivia Newton-John (2018) and Juliana Hatfield Sings The Police (2019).

Early life 
Hatfield grew up in the Boston suburb of Duxbury. Despite recording a song titled "My Sister", Hatfield has no sisters but she does have two brothers.

Her father claimed his family descended from the West Virginia Hatfields of the Hatfield–McCoy feud following the Civil War. Her father served in the U.S. Navy during the Vietnam War.

Hatfield went to Duxbury High School in Duxbury, Massachusetts. She attended Boston University and studied at Berklee College of Music in Boston, Massachusetts. She lives in Cambridge, Massachusetts.

Hatfield also attended art school at the School of the Museum of Fine Arts, Boston in 2012 in a year-long, post-baccalaureate certificate program, to study painting.

Music career

First bands and solo album 
Hatfield acquired a love of rock music during the 1970s, having been introduced by a babysitter to the music of the Los Angeles punk rock band X, which proved a life-changing experience. She was also attracted to the music of more mainstream artists like Olivia Newton-John and The Police.

While still at Berklee College of Music in 1986, she formed the band Blake Babies with John Strohm and Freda Love.  The band released 4 albums between 1987 and 1991, and gained critical notice in Rolling Stone and the Village Voice, local radio airplay and press, and label support from Mammoth Records in North Carolina.  The band broke up in 1992, but had a brief reunion in 2001 to produce another album.

After the break-up of the Blake Babies, she joined The Lemonheads as their bass player, replacing founding bassist Jesse Peretz, and played on their breakthrough album It's a Shame About Ray in 1992.  She left the band after about a year, but returned in 1993 as a guest vocalist on several tracks of Come on Feel the Lemonheads.

In 1992, she released her debut solo album Hey Babe.

The Juliana Hatfield Three 

Her commercial breakthrough came in 1993 with the formation of the band The Juliana Hatfield Three along with high-school friend Dean Fisher on bass and former Bullet LaVolta drummer Todd Philips, with herself performing lead vocal and lead guitar duties.  The band produced the album Become What You Are and two hit singles, "My Sister" and "Spin the Bottle".

"My Sister" was based on Hatfield's older brother's girlfriend, Maggie Rafferty, who lived with the family while Hatfield was in high school. She enjoyed Rafferty's eclectic record collection. Rafferty also took Hatfield to see the Del Fuegos and the Violent Femmes, which inspired her to form a band.

"Spin the Bottle" was used in the soundtrack of the Hollywood film Reality Bites (1994). Hatfield also made the cover of Spin magazine.

Hatfield was profiled in a number of girls' magazines, most notably Sassy, at this time and addressed serious issues faced by young women in her songs and interviews. About this period she says: "I was never comfortable with the attention. I thought it had come too soon. I hadn’t earned it yet." She gained notoriety in 1992 for saying that she was still a virgin in her mid-twenties in Interview magazine. In a 1994 interview for the magazine Vox, she said she was surprised by the effect 'outing' herself had: "I think there are a lot of people out there who don't care about sex, but who you never hear from, so I thought I should say it. The magazine I did the interview for is full of beef-cake hunky guys and scantily-clad models, so I thought it would be really funny to say that I didn't care about sex in a magazine that's full of sex and beauty – but no one really got the joke."

Over the years Hatfield's virginity would become a recurring theme in her press coverage, often accompanied by speculation that she had lost her virginity to The Lemonheads' leader Evan Dando who had referred to her as his "friend and sometimes girlfriend." In 2006, Hatfield sent a letter to The Weekly Dig in critique of writer Debbie Driscoll's scathing review of Soul Asylum's latest album, The Silver Lining. Kevin Dean from the newspaper responded by bringing up the subject of Hatfield losing her virginity to Dando; Hatfield fired back at Dean for bringing up her sex life, while stating that she and Dando never had sex, and that it was in fact Spike Jonze that she had lost her virginity to. She would later admit that she lost her virginity when she was 26 and "damn ready."

Return to solo career 

The Juliana Hatfield Three only remained together through 1994, by 1995 she had returned to solo status and released the album Only Everything, in which she "turned up the volume and the distortion and had a lot of fun". One reviewer describes it as "a fun, engaging pop album". The album spawned another alternative radio hit for Hatfield in "Universal Heartbeat".  In the video Hatfield portrayed a demanding aerobics instructor. Before the tour for Only Everything, she released Phillips and hired Jason Sutter on drums, Ed Slanker on guitar, and Lisa Mednick on keyboards. Two weeks into the tour, she canceled the tour.

In her memoir, Hatfield writes that she was suffering from depression severe enough to be suicidal. She disagreed with the decision to avoid talking about her depression. The drummer was replaced by Phillips, and touring resumed with Jeff Buckley as the opening act.

In 1996, she traveled to Woodstock, New York where she recorded tracks for God's Foot, which was to be her fourth solo album (third if not counting Become What You Are, which was recorded with the Juliana Hatfield Three), intended for 1997 release. After three failures to satisfy requests by Atlantic Records to come up with a single, she asked to be released from her contract. The label obliged but kept the rights to the songs recorded during these sessions. Atlantic had paid $180,000 on the recordings. "Mountains of Love" and "Fade Away" were released on a greatest hits collection entitled Gold Stars, while  "Can't Kill Myself" was available for download from Hatfield's website. The remaining tracks surfaced on bootlegs, which she disapproved of, and she has rarely played them live.

In 1997 Hatfield toured with Lilith Fair, an all-female rock festival founded by singer Sarah McLachlan.

After the experience of God's Foot, and freed from her label obligations, Hatfield recorded the EP  Please Do Not Disturb for the independent label Bar/None. Produced by Hatfield, the album included drummer Todd Phillips, guitarists Ed Slanker and Mike Leahy, and bassist Mikey Welsh of Weezer. The EP included "Trying Not to Think About It," a tribute to her friend, deceased musician Jeff Buckley.

Almost as a reaction to the seemingly endless studio sessions surrounding God's Foot, Hatfield recorded the album Bed in 1998 in six days, about which she said on her website, "It sounds as raw as I felt. It has no pretty sheen. The mistakes and unattractive parts were left in, not erased. Just like my career. Just like life."

In 2000, she released Beautiful Creature. This album left the rockier side of Hatfield's musical personality unexpressed, however, so simultaneously she released Juliana's Pony: Total System Failure with Zephan Courtney and Mikey Welsh. She called the latter album "a loud release of tension" with "lots of long sloppy guitar solos. And no love songs...a not-at-all attractive reaction to the ugly side of humanity, specifically American culture." Billboard called the first "a collection of plaintive demos" and the second "chock-a-block with punk guitar missives." Juliana's Pony: Total System Failure was panned by some critics who preferred the more acoustic Beautiful Creature. On Beautiful Creature, Hatfield worked with musician Davíd Garza who co-produced much of the album. Wally Gagel, a producer for Sebadoh and Tanya Donelly, helped Hatfield record her most electronica-influenced songs, "Cool Rock Boy" and "Don't Rush Me", which added texture to the otherwise acoustic album.

In 2002, Hatfield released Gold Stars 1992–2002: The Juliana Hatfield Collection. It contained singles from her solo albums, two songs from the unreleased God's Foot, a cover of Neil Young's "Only Love Can Break Your Heart", and new songs.

In 2004, Hatfield released In Exile Deo, an attempt at a more commercial sound with input from producers and engineers who had worked with Pink and Avril Lavigne. Hatfield produced the album with David Leonard, receiving co-production credits on "Jamie's in Town" and the bright rocker "Sunshine". The critics praised it, with some calling it her best work since the start of her solo career.

Ye Olde Records 
By contrast, the 2005 album Made in China was recorded in Bellows Falls, Vermont and Cambridge, Massachusetts, and was released on her own record label, Ye Olde Records. The record had a much rawer feel, with Hatfield playing instruments accompanied by the band Unbusted and other contributors. For the first time, Hatfield also played drums on at least one track.

John Doe of the band X described the disc as "a frighteningly dark and beautiful record filled with stark, angular, truly brutal songs and guitars. This is surely a 'Woman Under the Influence', though I'm not sure of what." Reviews were mixed, with some liking the lo-fi sound and others seeing it as slackness.

The release of Made in China started a trend where Hatfield licensed her music, selling it via her website and with a distribution deal through Red Eye.

In December 2005, Hatfield toured the United States with the band X, whom she idolized during her teenage years.

In 2006, Hatfield released her first live album. Titled The White Broken Line: Live Recordings, the album featured performances from her tour with X. It was Hatfield's third release for her record label.

Hatfield's 9th studio album, How to Walk Away, was released on August 19, 2008, on Ye Olde Records. The album's heartfelt subject on the break-up of a relationship resonated with critics, who gave the album largely positive reviews, with some hailing it as her best album since In Exile Deo.

Hatfield returned two years later as her 10th studio album Peace & Love was released on Ye Olde Records, February 16, 2010.  The album's composition, arrangement, performance, production, engineering, and mixing were solely credited to Hatfield. The album received mixed reviews, with several complaining the album's low-key moody nature working against the potential of the songs.

Hatfield offered, via her website, to write custom songs in order to fund a couple of projects; one of which was to release archive material. About halfway through the project, Hatfield stated that it had "completely re-energized and inspired" her again.

During October 2010 Hatfield and Evan Dando played two sell-out acoustic live shows together at The Mercury Lounge in New York. The following month the duo played sell out shows in Allston, a neighborhood of Boston. This tour was followed, in January 2011, by five dates on the American east coast.

PledgeMusic 

In April 2011, Hatfield announced her intention to work on a new album via fan-funding platform website PledgeMusic, from which she asked fans to help fund the project in exchange for personal artwork and memorabilia ranging from posters, CDs, and demos to one of Juliana's First Act guitars (used during the recording sessions) and even locks of her hair. The project also included donations for the Save a Sato foundation to which Hatfield is a major contributor. Fan response was enthusiastic, going over 400% of the original project cost. The album was originally going to be titled Speeches Delivered to Animals and Plants, in reference to a passage in the John Irving novel The World According to Garp, but later Hatfield herself changed it to There's Always Another Girl, in reference to a song in the album of the same name she had written as a defense for Lindsay Lohan after watching her flop I Know Who Killed Me.

There's Always Another Girl was released on August 30, 2011, again independently on her Ye Olde Records label, though a downloadable version was made available to contributors a month before on July 27, which was Juliana's birthday. The album has received mostly positive reviews from critics.

On August 28, 2012, Juliana Hatfield released a covers record titled Juliana Hatfield on her Ye Olde Records label. The album features covers of songs originally performed by The Who, Liz Phair, Creedence Clearwater Revival, Ryan Adams, I Blame Coco, and Led Zeppelin.

As of July 2013, Juliana Hatfield has finished recording her thirteenth solo album, Wild Animals, with crowd-funding—for the third time—through PledgeMusic.

In December 2014, Paste Magazine named her track "Needle in the Hay," an Elliott Smith cover, as No. 10 one of the "20 Best Cover Songs of 2014." The review called the cover "a more upbeat, approachable take on Smith’s disparate, wrought-iron classic. But even though it now employs bass, drums, tambourine and synth, the songs stays true to the sorrowful, tension-riddled original." Also that month, SPIN Magazine named the cover one of the "40 Best 2014 Songs by 1994 Artists ," where it came it at No. 36. The review stated "The tempo's a bit quicker, and she double-tracks herself for the song’s entirety. But the (tasteful) inclusion of chintzy drum programming and mellotron cleverly point to Smith's eventual creative direction."

Reformation of The Juliana Hatfield Three 

In 2014, The Juliana Hatfield Three reunited two decades after it disbanded. She used PledgeMusic to raise funds for the new album, titled Whatever, My Love, the trio's first since 1993's Become What You Are. Hatfield said, "We haven't totally reinvented the wheel or anything," and that the tracks exhibit the "stuff I am sort of known for, I guess. But I am a lot more confident now than I was then with the first album. And I had more fun recording this one." The twelve tracks for Whatever, My Love were recorded at Nuthouse Recording in Hoboken, New Jersey with Beaujour and Hatfield co-producing.

The lead single, "If I Could," was released in December 2014 and was premiered in Rolling Stone.  That month the album was made available for pre-order on American Laundromat Records with an announced release date of  February 17, 2015. The band announced they would tour the United States in support of the album throughout February, visiting cities on both coasts and in the midwest, and appearing at the Bowery Ballroom in New York City, and The Roxy Theatre in Los Angeles.

In late December 2014, Stereogum named the album "one of their most anticipated albums of 2015," and on January 4, 2015, Consequence of Sound named it "one of the 50 most anticipated albums of 2015." On January 9, 2015, Hatfield was featured at Nylon.com, which wrote that the upcoming album came off as "unforced, and with its sly lyrics and mega-hooky coffeehouse-grunge aesthetic." The album's second single "Ordinary Guy" premiered on Consequence of Sound on January 14, 2015.

Recent collaborations and solo work 
In 2015, Hatfield and Paul Westerberg announced that they have formed a new group, called the I Don't Cares.  They released the album Wild Stab in 2016.

Since then, Hatfield has released a number of solo albums, including two albums of all cover songs, Juliana Hatfield Sings Olivia Newton-John (2018) and Juliana Hatfield Sings The Police (2019) and three albums of original work, Pussycat (2017), Weird (2019) and  Blood (2021).

In 2019, Hatfield hinted that her next covers album would take on the work of an American artist, having already done an Australian (Newton-John) and an English band (The Police). In an interview for the book I'm Your Fan: The Songs of Leonard Cohen, Hatfield revealed that she was considering R.E.M. for her next cover album installment.

Musical style

Style and influences 
From her work with the Blake Babies to the present, Hatfield's output has been characterized by an alternation between heavy, rocking tunes and songs written in a gentler, more melodic or folk-oriented style.  Hatfield has stated that in the 1990s she tried smoking cigarettes for a short time in the hope of giving her voice a rougher quality, but eventually reconciled herself with her distinctive vocal instrument.

Hatfield's musical influences are diverse, ranging from punk groups like X, The Stooges, and The Replacements to more folk-oriented rock artists like Neil Young, whose songs the Blake Babies frequently covered in live shows.  Her work has also cross-fertilized with some other contemporaneous indie rock bands such as Dinosaur Jr. and Lemonheads, whose musicians are also friends of Hatfield's.  From an early age, she has also had a special love for pretty-sounding pop music.  In a 1998 interview, she stated, "I just always liked pop music and really good melodies and major chords. That's just the type of music that comes naturally to me". In a 1993 interview in Melody Maker magazine, Hatfield stated that her enthusiasm for the music of the pop group Wilson Phillips apparently led, at least in part, to the breakup of the Blake Babies.

Lyrics 
Hatfield nonetheless describes herself as very shy and somewhat of a loner, and has said that "happy lyrics don't come naturally to me." She has described her music and songwriting as a form of therapy, an outlet that helps her to overcome rough periods and depression.

Collaborations 
Hatfield has also recorded with The Lemonheads, living for a time with Evan Dando in the college neighborhood of Allston in Boston, and contributed backing vocals to recordings by Belly, Giant Sand, Susanna Hoffs, Aimee Mann, and Mary Lou Lord. She teamed up with Dando in 1999 to record Gram Parsons's song "$1,000 Wedding" on the compilation, Return of the Grievous Angel: A Tribute to Gram Parsons.

Some Girls 
In 2001, she joined with Freda Love and Heidi Gluck (of The Pieces and The Only Children) to form the trio Some Girls, with which she performs in addition to her solo work; the group has toured the United States twice and has released two albums.  The trio is another outlet for Hatfield's more lighthearted material. Their first album, entitled Feel It, was released by Koch Records in 2003. The lead single "Necessito" is a funky affirmation of the power of music, sung in a mixture of English and Spanish. Some Girls' second album, Crushing Love, was released in July 2006.

Frank Smith 
In 2007 Hatfield signed the Boston (now Austin)-based band Frank Smith to her record label, Ye Olde Records.  Along with releasing their 2007 album Heavy Handed Peace and Love, Hatfield also recorded an EP with the band titled Sittin' in a Tree.  The EP, produced by Frank Smith's Aaron Sinclair, features banjos, pedal steel, and other instruments normally associated with country music.

Minor Alps 
Hatfield and Matthew Caws of Nada Surf formed a band called Minor Alps whose first album, Get There, was released October 29, 2013, on Barsuk Records.

The I Don't Cares 
Hatfield and Paul Westerberg formed The I Don't Cares, releasing "Wild Stab" January 22, 2016, on Dry Wood Records.

Writing and acting 
Beyond her musical accomplishments, Hatfield has also guest-starred on several television shows, including The Adventures of Pete & Pete as a lunch lady and on the cult classic My So-Called Life's 1994 Christmas episode as a deceased homeless girl who has become an angel. During the mid-1990s she was a staple on MTV's 120 Minutes alternative music program, and she performed on the Late Show with David Letterman and Late Night with Conan O'Brien in 1995.

On March 25, 2008, Hatfield began her own blog through her website titled An Arm and A Leg. The blogs lasted about a year before being removed. Each week, or thereabouts, she revealed the influences behind one of her songs.

Hatfield briefly appeared on an episode of Space Ghost Coast to Coast named "Surprise", which aired on June 19, 1996. Instead of being interviewed, she simply said "uhh" and then was zapped by Zorak.

Hatfield released the book When I Grow Up: A Memoir on September 22, 2008.

Personal life
Hatfield has been a vegetarian for many years.

Discography

Studio albums

 Hey Babe (1992)
 Become What You Are (1993)
 Only Everything (1995)
 Bed (1998)
 Beautiful Creature (2000)
 Juliana's Pony: Total System Failure (2000)
 In Exile Deo (2004)
 Made in China (2005)
 How to Walk Away (2008)
 Peace & Love (2010)
 There's Always Another Girl (2011)
 Juliana Hatfield (2012)
 Wild Animals (2013)
 Whatever, My Love (2015)
 Pussycat (2017)
 Juliana Hatfield Sings Olivia Newton-John (2018)
 Weird (2019)
 Juliana Hatfield Sings The Police (2019)
 Blood (2021)

Blake Babies 

 Nicely, Nicely (1987)
 Earwig (1989)
 Sunburn (1990)
 God Bless the Blake Babies (2001)

The Lemonheads 
 It's a Shame About Ray (1992)
 Come on Feel the Lemonheads (1993)

Some Girls 

 Feel It (2003)
 Crushing Love (2006)

Minor Alps 
 Get There (2013)

The I Don't Cares 
 Wild Stab (2016)

Books 
 Hatfield, Juliana (2008). When I Grow Up: A Memoir. Wiley Publishing. . 336 pp.

References

Further reading 
 LeRoy, Dan (2007). The Greatest Music Never Sold: Secrets of Legendary Lost Albums by David Bowie, Seal, Beastie Boys, Chicago, Mick Jagger, and More!. Backbeat Books. . .
 Reisfeld, Randi (1996). This Is the Sound!:  The Best of Alternative Rock. New York: Simon Pulse.  .

External links 

 
 
 

Living people
Singers from Maine
Musicians from Cambridge, Massachusetts
People from Wiscasset, Maine
American autobiographers
American women guitarists
American women singer-songwriters
20th-century American singers
21st-century American singers
American women rock singers
American indie rock musicians
American multi-instrumentalists
American pop guitarists
American rock bass guitarists
American rock drummers
American rock guitarists
American rock keyboardists
American rock songwriters
Atlantic Records artists
Berklee College of Music alumni
Women bass guitarists
Lead guitarists
Singer-songwriters from Massachusetts
The Lemonheads members
Women autobiographers
Zoë Records artists
Songwriters from Maine
Guitarists from Maine
Guitarists from Massachusetts
20th-century American drummers
20th-century American bass guitarists
American women non-fiction writers
20th-century American women singers
21st-century American women singers
1967 births
Mammoth Records artists
People from Duxbury, Massachusetts
Duxbury High School alumni
Bar/None Records artists